Luxol St Andrews Futsal Club is a Maltese futsal club based in St. Andrew's. In recent seascons it has been one of the most successful clubs on the island, winning four league titles and one cup.

Current squad
The following players played the 2021–22 UEFA Futsal Champions League.

Captaincy
Mark Zammit

Technical staff
Head coach:  Gabriel Dobre
Team manager:  Nathaniel Jones

Achievements
 Maltese Futsal League
 Winners (4): 2014-15, 2016-17, 2018-19, 2020-21

 Maltese Futsal Cup
 Winners (2): 2015–16, 2018-19

 Maltese Futsal Super Cup
 Winners (2): 2016-17, 2017-18

European competitions record
Appearances: 5

Summary

Famous players

  William da Silva Barbosa
  Matthew Attard
  Mark Zammit

References

Futsal clubs in Malta
Pembroke, Malta